Noel Anthony Hogan (born 25 December 1971) is an Irish musician and record producer best known as the lead guitarist and co-songwriter of the Irish alt-rock band the Cranberries.

The Cranberries
Hogan formed the Cranberries with his brother Mike and drummer Fergal Lawler in 1989. The group recruited Dolores O'Riordan as lead singer soon after forming. The band went on to sell in excess of 40 million records worldwide. In total, Hogan has released eight albums with the Cranberries.

The Cranberries went on a six-year hiatus from 2003 to 2009. However, after O'Riordan's death on 15 January 2018, Hogan confirmed the group’s disbandment, which occurred after the release of the posthumous album In the End in 2019, saying: "The Cranberries without Dolores just isn't The Cranberries... we won't replace our friend and lead singer".

Solo work
With the Cranberries on hiatus from 2003 to 2009, Hogan turned to focus on his own music. He began working with programmer Matt Vaughan, who had already done work on unreleased Cranberries songs and Dolores O'Riordan's solo material. Mono Band was born with Hogan as the sole band member. With vocals being supplied by Richard Walters, Alexandra Hamnede, Kate Havnevik, and other guest artists, Hogan worked with Cranberries' veteran producer Stephen Street to compile a mix of 12 tracks. Working on his side project at the same time, saw their resulting debut album, Mono Band, released on 20 May 2005. Hogan and Mono Band vocalist Richard Walters went on to form Arkitekt. Arkitekt released two EPs at that time in 2009, working on new material.

Hogan's work independent of the Cranberries has been released on his own label, Gohan Records and is published through Fairwood Music (UK) Ltd for the world.

Hogan has also been producing bands on the local music scene of Limerick. Gohan Records has recently released, in collaboration with Limerick Live 95FM's Green and Live show, "Tonelist", a collection featuring musicians in the Limerick music scene.

In 2022, Noel debuted The Puro, a new duo alongside Brazilian singer Mell Peck.

Musical equipment
Hogan's musical equipment that he has used with the Cranberries over the years includes:

Guitars
 Gibson Les Paul Custom
 PRS Guitars Artist 22
 Fender Jaguar
 Fender Telecaster
 Fender Stratocaster
 Gibson Jumbo Acoustic guitar
 Taylor Jumbo Acoustic guitar
 Gibson ES-335

Amplifiers
 Vox AC30
 Fender Twin Reverb
 Marshall 30th Anniversary 3-channel head
 Marshall 4x12 speaker cabinets
 Diezel VH4 amp head
 Mesa Boogie Mark II

Effects
Roland RE-301 Chorus Echo unit
 Ibanez Tube Screamer Overdrive pedal
 Pro Co RAT Distortion pedal
 Electro-Harmonix Big Muff Fuzz pedal
 Zvex Fuzz factory pedal
 Dunlop Manufacturing Tremolo pedal
 DigiTech Whammy pedal
 Electro-Harmonix Mirco-Synth pedal
 Watkins Copicat Delay pedal
 Line 6 Echo Park delay pedal

References

External links

Mono Band Official Website
Arkitekt Official Website
Richard Walters Official Website
Fairwood Music (UK) Ltd. Website

The Cranberries members
1971 births
Living people
Irish rock guitarists
Irish male guitarists
Irish alternative rock musicians
Irish songwriters
Irish record producers
Musicians from County Limerick